Praia Brava is a beach located at the northern end of the island of Santa Catarina Island, between Praia da Lagoinha and Praia dos Ingleses,  from the center of Florianópolis, capital of the State of Santa Catarina, and is one of the most beautiful beaches in this city. 

It is exposed to the action of the ocean swells, especially from the east that creates strong and wild waves, resulting in a perfect environment to practice surfing, bodyboarding and Standup paddleboarding. 

The community is small and consists mostly of condominium buildings that face the beach.

References

Beaches of Florianópolis
Neighbourhoods in Florianópolis